Craig Groeschel (born December 2, 1967) is the founder and senior pastor of Life.Church, an American evangelical multi-site church with locations in 12 U.S. states.

Early life and education 
Groeschel grew up in southern Oklahoma, attending Ardmore High School. After high school, he attended Oklahoma City University on a tennis scholarship and was a member of the Lambda Chi Alpha fraternity. He earned a bachelor's degree in Marketing. He met his wife Amy at OCU and the two married in 1991. That same year, Groeschel entered the ministry as an associate pastor in the United Methodist Church. He attended Phillips Theological Seminary, which is affiliated with the Christian Church (Disciples of Christ) and earned a Master of Divinity degree. He was an associate pastor at First United Methodist Church in Oklahoma City during the 1995 Oklahoma City Bombing.

Pastoral career
In 1996, Groeschel and a handful of people started Life Covenant Church in a two-car garage. He later told Business Week that he started the process by performing market research of non-churchgoers and designed his church in response to what he learned about people's preconceptions about boring church experiences. Groeschel's non-traditional style was successful and attendance of Life Covenant grew rapidly, eventually evolving to become the largest Protestant church in the United States with 44 physical Life.Church locations as of 2022. Groeschel began using video to deliver some of his sermons, when his fourth child was born in 2001, and he was unavailable for the Sunday service, discovering that the videos were popular with his churchgoers. In 2006, he set up a website called Mysecret.tv as a place for people to confess anonymously on the Internet. Groeschel also began delivering his services to the Second Life virtual world on Easter Sunday 2007.

Life.Church was named America's Most Innovative Church by Outreach Magazine in 2007 and 2008. Life.Church innovations include its free resource library with sermons, transcripts, videos, artwork, and a team that develops free software like ChurchOnlinePlatform.com and YouVersion the Bible app, which had been downloaded over 200 million times as of December 2015, and hit 500 million downloads as of November 2021.

Personal life
Groeschel is married to Amy and has six children and four grandchildren. They live in Edmond, Oklahoma, a suburb of Oklahoma City, where Life.Church is based.

Business
Groeschel served on the Board of Directors of Gulfport Energy Corporation. Groeschel's 2016 compensation was a grant of 3,824 equity shares on June 10, 2016  with a value of $125,006.56 at close of business that day. On December 15, 2017, Groeschel sold 7,059 shares of Gulfport Energy stock for $85,837 according to SEC filings. In November 2019, Gulfport Energy announced Groeschel’s resignation from the board.

References

Bibliography 
Chazown: A Different Way to See Your Life (2006) 
Confessions of a Pastor (2006) 
Going All the Way: Preparing for a Marriage That Goes the Distance (2007) 
It – How Churches and Leaders Can Get It and Keep It (2008) 
The Christian Atheist: Believing in God but Living as if He Doesn't Exist (2010) 
Dare To Drop The Pose (2010) 
Weird: Because Normal Isn't Working (2011) 
Love, Sex, and Happily Ever After (2011) 
Soul Detox: Clean Living in a Contaminated World (2012) 
Altar Ego: Becoming Who God Says You Are (2013) 
Fight: Winning the Battles that Matter Most (2013) 
 From this Day Forward: Five Commitments To Fail-Proof Your Marriage (2014) 
 #Struggles: Following Jesus in a Selfie-centered World (2015) 
Divine Direction: 7 decisions that will change your life (2017) 
Hope in the Dark : Believing God is good when life is not (2018) 
Dangerous Prayeres: Because Following Jesus Was Never Meant To Be Safe (2020) 
Winning The War In Your Mind: Change Your Thinking, Change Your Life (2021) 
Lead Like It Matters: 7 Leadership Principles For A Church That Lasts (2022) 
The Power to Change: Mastering the Habits That Matter Most (2023)

External links

Craig Groeschel web site

1967 births
Living people
Oklahoma City University alumni
People from Houston
People from Edmond, Oklahoma
American Methodist clergy
21st-century Methodist ministers
American United Methodist clergy
Oklahoma City Stars men's tennis players
21st-century American clergy